Guido Chiesa (born 1959) is an Italian film director and screenwriter.

Born in Turin, Chiesa graduated in philosophy and letters with a thesis in cinema, then he moved in New York City where he was the correspondent of several music magazines, but also the assistant of film directors such as Michael Cimino, Amos Poe and Jim Jarmusch, among others.  Returned in Italy, he made his directorial debut in 1991 with the drama film Il caso Martello. In 2000 he entered the competition at the 57th Venice International Film Festival with the war drama Johnny the Partisan.  He competed again at the Venice International Film Festival in 2004, with the drama film Lavorare con lentezza.

References

External links 
 

1959 births
Film people from Turin
Italian film directors
Living people
Italian screenwriters
Italian television directors
Italian male screenwriters